Public Joint-Stock Company Stakhanov Railway Car Building Works — industrial enterprise of Ukraine, located in the city of Stakhanov, Luhansk Oblast, producing freight cars.

History
The factory was founded as a weldments plant in 1962. On 29 June 1965 the first phase of the plant was put into operation with carrying capacity of 10 tons per year of steel constructions for tower cranes, draglines, elevator crane jibs and other equipment.

Since 1967, the plant has specialized in metal cages large capacity boilers for the construction of thermal and hydroelectric power. In December 1969, the plant was reconstructed for the production of mainline freight cars. Already in early 1970 the factory produced the first railway flat car with carrying capacity of 63 tons, mastered the production of wheels and rail carriages.

In 1976 the production of cars for mineral fertilizers was started.

In subsequent years, the design engineering bureau of the plant developed technical documentation for differently functioning cars and special vehicles with carrying capacity of 63 400 tones.

The enterprise mastered the production of railway carriers areal type, sunken-type, articulated, platform and coupling types, wagons for timber, cement, aluminum, construction materials, pelletized polymer materials, flour, containers with carrying capacity of 20 tons of bulk cargo and cement, long-platforms for transportation of large containers and wheeled vehicles, special conveyors, carrying capacity up to 240 tons for the carriage of heavy-duty power transformer and large power equipment, special vehicles for transportation of spent nuclear fuel from nuclear power plants, trucks (dump cars) with carrying capacity of 66 tons, 105 tons, 143 tons, 150 tons of wheel sets for freight wagons two-axle trucks and other products.

During the period 1987–1988, the plant was awarded with several prizes of the Ministry of Heavy and Transport Engineering for the development of cost-cutting rolled in serial production of lightweight wagon axles, for the design, development and production of rail transporter of areal type with carrying capacity of 120 tons of mod. 14-6063, for the design, development and production of cars for granular polymer mod. 17-495 and wagons for mineral fertilizer mod. 19-923.

In 1987, the Council of Ministers of Ukraine gave the plant the title "Enterprise of high quality."

In 1990 a group of plant workers was awarded by the Council of Ministers for the work "Complex research, development, industrial development and introduction into the operation of highly efficient heavy railway carriers." For the creation of the best examples of new technique plant was awarded with diplomas, medals and valuable gifts (cars) ENEA.

From 1988 to 1992, on request of the French firm Transmashlink plant produced and delivered 40,000 tons of welded steel constructions for building of a tunnel under the English Channel. Welding work on this contract is certified by Bureau Veritas (France).

The plant gained positive experience in supplying products to foreign partners: to Germany – metal items (flange), to Israel – welded steel, Iran – trucks and wheel sets 1435 mm, South Korea - 16-axle railway carrier of articulated type with carrying capacity of 170 tons.

On commission of the Federal Agency for Atomic Energy of Russia in the shortest time two railway carriers for transportation of nuclear fuel waste TK-13M were made.

In 2003 the serial production of new cars was started: hopper car with enlarged volume of a body, a hopper car unloading in space between the rails, tank wagons for transportation of light petroleum products, open-top car with blank body and open-top car with bottom discharge, which meet all the requirements demanded from the cars of new generation.

For 46 years the plant produced more than 100,000 freight cars, which operate in many countries around the world. Production of the plant is supplied to the public and private transport companies and industrial enterprises in Ukraine, CIS countries and abroad.

All products of PJSC Stakhanov Railway Car Building Works are made in accordance with Intergovernmental standards (GOST), State standards of Ukraine (DSTU) and international and European standards, is certified in the SS FZHT. The enterprise develops a quality management system in accordance with the requirements of МС ISO 9001:2008.

Events

100,000th carriage
A few commemorative events held on September 30, 2010, were dedicated to the production of the 100,000th railway wagon, produced by PJSC Stakhanov Railway Car Building Works. Perspectives of Stakhanov Railway Car Building Works contrasts today sharply with the difficult situation of crisis of previous years. The emergence of a new owner of a group of Finance and credit businessman Konstantin Zhevago, after which Stakhanov Wagon Works became a part of the holding company AvtoKrAZ, Vitaly Kasinov compared this event with the second birth of the company. Since 2005, the shareholders have invested to the development of the plant more than 60 million dollars, due to which the volumes of production have increased more than twice compared to the best years of car production in the Soviet times. Today, having constant one hundred percent workload with orders from the company VTB-Leasing, which holds the key position in the leasing segments of Russian railway equipment, Stakhanov builders of wagons reached the stable production of 660 cars per month. Subject to the continuation of investment inflow to the enterprise, the production will be developed, new jobsites will be created. Nowadays one can see that the specialists who were forced to leave the company in times of crisis returned to the plant. An increase of employees this year was 1500. Today, all products of Stakhanov builders of wagons are exported. But the administration of Stakhanov Railway Car Building Works hopes that their products will be of demand on the domestic market as well.

A record number of carriages
In 2010 Stakhanov Railway Car Building Works reached a record volume of output of products, which totaled 7,434 units of freight rolling stock – an unprecedented result for the entire 45-year-old history of the company. Compared with the 2009 the production of carriages was increased by 4.7 times or for 5,850 cars. In particular, 7,134 open-top cars and 300 hopper cars for the transportation of fertilizers were produced. The owner of the seven thousandth car became one of the largest leasing companies in Russia - VTB-Leasing, which is now a strategic partner of the company.

А universal gondola car of model 12-963
Specialists of the Design Management of SVGZ offer consumers of railway equipment a new model of gondola universal model 12 - 963, which fully meets the requirements for the cars of a new generation.

In comparison with the mass-produced gondola car of model 12-9046, a new model has an all-metal welded body volume which is increased by 2 cubic meters to 87 cubic meters. The cover of the side and the end walls is made of smooth sheet instead of the curved profile. On the end wall two zones and five efforts of the P-shaped cross section are set, which ensure high rigidity for the perception of stress in the collisions. Tare weight of the gondola car is reduced per ton. Bearing metal frame, body, parts of the brake linkage, cover of the body, the hatch covers are made of low-alloyed steel according to GOST 19281-89 14 category, the strength class of which is not less than 390. Centre girder is equipped with more technologically advanced and reliable in operation welded lugs. The running gear of the gondola car consists of 2 two-axle bogies of model 18-7020, which are equipped with elastic-rolling runner skids of a new system. In order to improve traffic safety the gondola is equipped with a new system of separate braking carts. Overhaul of the new gondola is increased to 32 years, whereas mileage of nowadays produced analogues is 22 years.

A prototype model of a new gondola car has passed a set of static and dynamic tests and the gondola car was recommended by the inter-ministerial commission for the certification in UkrCEPRO (Ukrainian Certification of Production) and RC FRT (Register on certification of the Federal Railway Transport).

Kasinov V.I.

Vitaly Kasinov headed PJSC "Stakhanov Railway Car Building Works" since 2004. Under his leadership has started a new stage of development of the company – production of commercial products increased 4-fold, from year to year are created a new work-places. From a simple manufacturer of freight rolling stock SVZ has turned to care of the consumer, proved by comprehensive analysis of the needs of cargo owners and carriers. The company is actively working to develop models of the new generation of cars, to implement the program of modernization of production.

Throughout its history, in 2010, SVZ entered the record indicators in production and social spheres.

Continuing to work on improving quality of the product, analyzing and expanding market outlets, introducing innovative programs, Stakhanov Railway Car Building Works today not only occupies a place of honor in the top list of the machine-building enterprises in Ukraine, but also contribute in the socio-economic development of the region and country.

During the work, Vitaly Kasinov has proved himself not only as experienced leader, but also a highly qualified specialist who aspires to improve own knowledge by actively participating in conferences, seminars, business meetings. Thanks to his professional activities a number of international contacts of SVZ with companies in the Mediterranean countries, the Baltic, the Caspian region became more active. And also the important fact is renewal and expansion of manufacture of welded metalwork.

At the same time one of the most significant events in his career in 2011, Vitaly Ivanovich considers the nomination of the winner of the XVI National Program "Man of the Year - 2011". March 24, 2012. During the 16th national ceremony-award "Man of the Year - 2011" among the three winners the Kasinov V.I. won the prestigious title of "Industrialist of the Year".

For high achievements in professional and public spheres of life, skill and talent, originality and charisma, the ability to lead and to be the best in the business, which serve Vitaly Ivanovich awarded the prize "Prometheus-Prestige",which presented Hero of Ukraine Mykola Yankovsky, who heads the group "Stirol".

"I am grateful to the organizers of the National Program" Man of the Year "and the Higher Academic Council for this award. But it's not quite true, since it is a merit, first of all, and the collective enterprise, and members of the Supervisory Board and the Joint-stock staff, and all those who are making every effort to develop and operate an enterprise for the benefit of our country "- commented his victory at the National Palace of Arts "Ukraine" Vitaly Kasinov.

This victory was not accidental, but is a natural result of professional and hard work of Vitaly Kasinov and almost five-thousandth collective headed by him.

"To be successful today is to be professional in your field, have a reliable partners and work for the result," - said Vitaly Ivanovich.

Production and services

Production
As of 2011 all enterprise production are exported.

Production of car building:
 hopper cars
 gondolas
 box cars
 tank cars
 flat cars
 platforms
 dump cars
 cars bunker type
 schnabel cars

Also mastered the production of undercarriages of the cars:
 Wheelsets
 two-axle bogies

Metal constructions:
lattice and solid columns
column ties
pitched and secondary trusses
crane runway and gantry girders
hammer beam
wind trusses
beams
enclosure structures
brake runway and trusses
bunkers of different capacities
stairs, fields, enclosures and other structures.

Services:
Development and coordination of design documents for freight wagons of various purposes, including transporters of various types of capacity up to 400 tons, special rail vehicles for PID (internal transport) and spare parts for freight cars, including load-carrying constructions for Schnabel cars
Development of design documentation stage of CMD on working drawings of the customer under the CM for building metal constructions (columns, trusses, beams, bridge construction, etc.)
Bending works
Mechanical working of parts
Mechanical working of wood and metal
Mechanical working of castings
Metal-roll heat treatment
Gear-cutting work
Lathes work
Works in thermal stations and facilities of high electro-and high-frequency
Electricity, gas-welding operation, control of weld
Works with manual and electrical tools and pneumatic tools and instruments
Locksmithing
Turning and boring work
Round-grinding work
Machining of large parts
Metal cutting
Treatment of joints
Blasting surface treatment
Surface work
Gear- grinding Work
Gear- grinding Work
Varnish-and-paint work, primer, coat-work, anti-corrosion surface treatment
Service batteries, galvanic work
Works related to the annealing of steel, alloys and castings
Mechanical installation
Manufacturing and testing of slings
Manufacturing of compression tank

External links
 Official website of Stakhanov Railway Car Building Works

Rolling stock manufacturers of Ukraine
Vehicle manufacturing companies established in 1962
1962 establishments in Ukraine
1962 establishments in the Soviet Union